The Chairman of the Mongolian People's Party is the leader of the Mongolian People's Party (previously the Mongolian People's Revolutionary Party). With some exceptions, the office was synonymous with leaders of the Mongolian People's Republic. Throughout its history the office had three other names: Secretary, First Secretary, and General Secretary.

List

References

Mongolian People's Party
Mongolian politicians
Communism in Mongolia